This is a list of movements that dispute the legitimacy of a reigning monarch.  It includes those movements that believe a current monarch is on the throne unlawfully, but does not include groups that oppose monarchy generally (such as those that favor replacing a monarchy with a republican system of government).

Carlism
Carlism is a movement in that seeks the establishment of another line of the Bourbon family on the Spanish throne, in preference to the current Spanish King, Felipe VI. Carlists dispute that Ferdinand VII had the authority to change the Spanish monarchy's line of succession by issuing the Pragmatic Sanction of 1830 and claim that such document was without legal effect. The Pragmatica Sanción resulted in Fernando's daughter Isabella II, rather than his brother, Infante Carlos, becoming the Spanish monarch.

Jacobitism
Jacobitism asserts that the Glorious Revolution was unlawful and effected a de facto but not de jure change in the line of succession to the British Monarchy.  In the Jacobite view, William and Mary of Orange and their successors were never legitimate British rulers.  Instead, the lawful king or queen of England and Scotland has continued to be the heir-general of the House of Stuart.

Miguelism
Miguelism was a Portuguese movement named after king Miguel I of Portugal.

The death of King John VI of Portugal (1826) created a dispute over royal succession. While Dom Pedro, the Emperor of Brazil, was the king's oldest son, his younger brother Miguel contended that Pedro had forfeited his claim to the Portuguese throne by declaring Brazil's independence.

Pedro briefly entitled himself king (as Pedro IV of Portugal). Neither the Portuguese nor the Brazilians wanted a unified monarchy again. So, Pedro abdicated in favor of his daughter, Maria, a child of 7, with his sister Isabel Maria as regent.

However, the absolutist party of the landowners and the Church, were not satisfied with this compromise, and they continued to regard Miguel as the legitimate successor to the throne on the grounds that according to the Portuguese succession rules (approved by the Cortes after the 1640 Restoration), Pedro had lost the right to the Portuguese crown, when he took possession of a foreign crown (Brazil). They also were alarmed by the liberal reforms that had been initiated in Spain by the liberals.

In February 1828, Miguel returned to Portugal to take the oath of allegiance to the Charter and assume the regency. The Cortes of 1828 proclaiming him king as Miguel I of Portugal and he reigned from 1828 to 1834.

But in the end (after the Liberal Wars) the Miguelists (absolutists) were defeated and the king was exiled.

Legitimism
The Legitimists are royalists in France who adhere to the rights of dynastic succession of the descendants of the elder branch of the Bourbon dynasty, which was overthrown in the 1830 July Revolution.

Sedevacantism
Sedevacantism holds that the current Roman Catholic pope, Francis, is illegitimate.  More generally, sedevacantists believe that the Chair of Saint Peter has been vacant since the death of Pope Pius XII in 1958 or Pope John XXIII in 1963 and that subsequent holders of the papal throne have not been true popes.  This movement is largely driven by opposition to liturgical reforms introduced by the Second Vatican Council, especially replacement of the Tridentine Mass with the Mass of Paul VI and authorizing the saying of the Mass in vernacular languages rather than ecclesiastical Latin.

References

Monarchy
Dispute movements
Royalty-related lists
Political movements